Lackford Lakes is a  biological Site of Special Scientific Interest (SSSI) north and east of Lackford in Suffolk. The SSSI is part of the  Lackford Lakes nature reserve, which is managed by the Suffolk Wildlife Trust.

The lakes are disused sand and gravel pits in the valley of the River Lark. There are diverse dragonfly species, and many breeding and overwintering birds, including nationally important numbers of gadwalls and shovelers. Skylarks breed on dry grassland, and lapwings in marshy meadows.

There is access from the A1101 road.

References

Suffolk Wildlife Trust
Sites of Special Scientific Interest in Suffolk